Félix Auger-Aliassime defeated Holger Rune in the final, 6–3, 7–5 to win the singles tennis title at the 2022 Swiss Indoors. It was his third title in as many weeks and fourth career ATP Tour singles title overall.

Roger Federer was the reigning champion from 2019, when the tournament was last held, but retired from professional tennis in September 2022.

Seeds

Draw

Finals

Top half

Bottom half

Qualifying

Seeds

Qualifiers

Lucky loser

Qualifying draw

First qualifier

Second qualifier

Third qualifier

Fourth qualifier

References

External links
 Main draw
 Qualifying draw

Swiss Indoors - Singles
2022 Singles